Jakob Tanner (born 18 December 1946) is a Swiss former wrestler who competed in the 1972 Summer Olympics.

References

External links
 

1946 births
Living people
Olympic wrestlers of Switzerland
Wrestlers at the 1972 Summer Olympics
Swiss male sport wrestlers